Fairpark is a western neighborhood of Salt Lake City, Utah. It lies north of Poplar Grove and south of Rose Park.  It is one of the smaller neighborhoods in Salt Lake and is often confused with Rose Park. On the east it is bordered by 500 West and extends west to 1460 West, then following the Jordan River to 700 North, the boundary then curves down to 600 North back to 500 West.  On its south, Fairpark is bordered by North Temple which features the iconic restaurant, Red Iguana.  This area is rich with diversity, and growing as the city expands west.  The neighborhood includes smaller community areas including Guadalupe, Jackson, and Onequa. It has one public school,  Mary W. Jackson elementary school. The neighborhood is named after the State Fairpark, which takes up a large portion of the area.

Fairpark is home to over 2,800 households and is less than a 5-minute drive to downtown Salt Lake City.  For more information about Fairpark, visit the Fairpark Community homepage.

Fairpark is also home to local artist Ann Pineda, whose paintings were featured at the Anderson-Foothill Branch of the Salt Lake City Library in October, 2015.

Neighborhoods in Salt Lake City